The third season of Canada's Drag Race premiered on July 14 and concluded on September 8, 2022. The season airs on Crave in Canada, BBC Three in the United Kingdom and WOW Presents Plus internationally.

Casting for the third season started late 2021 and the twelve contestants were announced on June 15, 2022.

The winner of the third season of Canada’s Drag Race was Gisèle Lullaby, with Jada Shada Hudson as runner-up. Vivian Vanderpuss was named Miss Congeniality, although her win was announced by the producers on the show's social media channels rather than in the finale episode.

Following the death of Queen Elizabeth II on September 8, 2022, the broadcast of the finale was delayed in the United Kingdom during the period of national mourning.

Contestants

Ages, names, and cities stated are at time of filming.

Notes:

Contestant progress

Lip syncs
Legend:

Guest judges
In June 2022, the judges for the third season were announced. Brooke Lynn Hytes, Brad Goreski, and Traci Melchor remain behind the judging table. The season also includes several guest judges, listed in chronological order:
Monika Schnarre, model
Carole Pope, singer
Vanessa Vanjie Mateo, contestant on Season 10 and Season 11 of RuPaul's Drag Race
Hollywood Jade, dancer and choreographer
Jimbo, contestant on the first season of Canada's Drag Race and on RuPaul's Drag Race: UK vs the World
Sarain Fox, activist
Mei Pang, makeup artist and beauty vlogger
Jeremy Dutcher, musicologist
Lesley Hampton, anishinaabe artist and fashion designer
Sarah Nurse, hockey player

Special guests

Episode 9:
Icesis Couture, winner of the second season of Canada's Drag Race

Episodes

Awards

References

2022 Canadian television seasons
2022 in LGBT history
Canada's Drag Race seasons